The plain mountain finch (Leucosticte nemoricola) is a species of finch in the family Fringillidae.

It is found in Afghanistan, Bhutan, China, India, Kazakhstan, Myanmar, Nepal, Pakistan, Russia, Tajikistan, Tibet, and Turkmenistan. Its natural habitat is temperate grassland and upland forest.  It is a resident breeder across the Himalayas.

References

plain mountain finch
Birds of Mongolia
Birds of the Himalayas
Birds of Central Asia
Birds of Tibet
plain mountain finch
Taxonomy articles created by Polbot